Matumbi may refer to:
the Matumbi people
the Matumbi language
Matumbi (band)